Velsor is an extinct town in northern Christian County, in the U.S. state of Missouri. The GNIS classifies it as a populated place. The community was northeast of Sparta between Missouri Route 14 and Finley Creek.

A post office called Velsor was established in 1881, and remained in operation until 1901. The community has the name of James Velsor, an early settler.

References

Ghost towns in Missouri
Former populated places in Christian County, Missouri